Ya'akov Mizrahi (1919 – 13 August 1979) was an Israeli politician who served as a member of the Knesset for Agudat Yisrael between 1972 and 1974.

Biography
Mizrachi was born in Rehovot in 1919 to a family who had made aliyah from Yemen. He was on the Agudat Yisrael list for the 1969 elections, and although he failed to win a seat, he entered the Knesset on 27 November 1972 as a replacement for Shlomo-Ya'akov Gross, who had resigned his seat as part of a rotation agreement. He was a member of Internal Affairs Committee until losing his seat in the 1973 elections.

He died in 1979.

One son, David, died during the Yom Kippur War, whilst the other Eliezer, also became a member of the Knesset for Agudat Yisrael.

References

External links

1919 births
1979 deaths
20th-century Israeli Jews
People from Rehovot
Jews in Mandatory Palestine
Members of the 7th Knesset (1969–1974)
Agudat Yisrael politicians
Israeli people of Yemeni-Jewish descent